Zinc finger protein 502 is a protein that in humans is encoded by the ZNF502 gene.

References

Further reading 

Human proteins